Raees is a 1976 Indian Hindi-language  drama film produced by Jashmendar Singh. The film is directed by Vishnu Raaje. The film stars Yogeeta Bali, Kiran Kumar, A.K. Hangal, Utpal Dutt. The film's music is by Sapan Jagmohan. The film was released on 12 December 1976.

Plot
Story of poor orphaned youth, who agreed rich man's daughter to marry with him, Ramesh the millionaire son who tries his best to console his family members to marry with Radha against her husband but Radha knows the greatness of her husband Kanhaiya, she left her house with her husband and child to live their own lives.

Cast

 Yogeeta Bali
Kiran Kumar 
A. K. Hangal
Utpal Dutt 
Ruby Myers
Gulshan Arora
Ramesh Deo
Helen
Aruna Irani

Crew
Director - Vishnu Raaje
Producer - Jashmendar Singh
Production Company - 
Story - Vijay Tendulkar
Writer - Vishwamitra Adil Vijay Tendulkar
Dialogue - Vishwamitra Adil
Editor - B S Glaad
Cinematographer - Narayan Rao
Art Director - Gurdayal Singh
Costume Designer - Mino Rabadi, Super Tailors
Choreographer - Kamal, Badoor
 Studio  - Kamera Arts

Music

References

External links
 

1976 films
Indian drama films
1970s Hindi-language films
Hindi films remade in other languages
1976 drama films
Hindi-language drama films
Films scored by Sapan-Jagmohan